Uttarā or Anglicized as Uttaraa (उत्तरा) was the daughter of Queen Sudeshna and King Virata, at whose court the Pandavas spent a year in concealment during their exile. She was sister of Uttara, Sveta and Shanka.

Training under Brihannala
 Uttaraa learned dance under Arjuna's  training during the Pandavas' year of exile in the Matsya Kingdom. Living incognito, as required by the terms of banishment, Arjuna lived as a eunuch named Brihannala, teaching the skills that he had learned from the apsaras in heaven.

Marriage and widowhood

Once King Virata realized who Uttaraa's dance teacher was, he offered his daughter's hand to Arjuna. However, Arjuna clarified to King Virata the relationship that a teacher has with a student is like that of a parent to a child, but suggested that Uttaraa become his daughter-in-law by marrying his son Abhimanyu. 

Uttaraa was widowed at a very young age when Abhimanyu, himself only sixteen years old, was killed in the Kurukshetra war. Overwhelmed with grief at the sight of her husband's body, she was consoled by Krishna.

Ashwatthama's attack
Towards the end of the Mahabharata war, when Uttaraa was pregnant, Ashwathama, son of Dronacharya, while trying to avenge the defeat of Duryodhana and the Kaurava army, was challenged by Arjuna. Knowing he could not win with conventional arms, Ashwatthama invoked the Brahmashira. When Arjuna fired a Brahmastra to match, Narada and Vyasa intervened, commanding both men to withdraw their weapons. While Arjuna successfully did so, Ashwatthama did not possess the required capacity.  Still consumed by the desire for vengeance, Ashwatthama decided that if he could not end the Pandavas, he would end their lineage, aiming the weapon at Uttaraa's womb, killing the unborn Parikshit.

When Uttaraa went into labour, Krishna revived the stillborn baby, and the infant was then named Parikshit, meaning 'he who has been tested'. 

Furious at the thought of a warrior turning his weapons on an unborn child, Krishna cursed  Ashwatthama to live for millennia, completely alone and burdened by diseases, repelled by the stench of his own pus.  

According to the Ashramavasika Parva, fifteen years after the war Dhritarashtra, Gandhari, Kunti, and Vidura departed for the forest. Months later, when the Pandavas sought to meet their elders, the sage Sage Vyasa was also present. Through the rishi's power, the dead were given life for a night; as day dawned, Vyasa asked all the widows who wished to join their spouses to walk into the river Ganga, and Uttaraa might have accepted the offer. 

Significantly, when the Pandavas finally renounced the world it was Subhadra, and not Uttaraa, who was entrusted to take care of the young Parikshit.

References

Characters in the Mahabharata